Cole Krueger (born 22 August 1991) is a Hungarian short track speed skater.

He participated at the 2019 World Short Track Speed Skating Championships, winning a medal. Cole competed for the US until 2018, when he switched his representation to Hungary. His brother, John-Henry Krueger, made the same move in 2019.

References

External links

1991 births
Living people
Hungarian male short track speed skaters
Sportspeople from Pittsburgh
World Short Track Speed Skating Championships medalists